Zafar Iqbal (born 10 April 1982) is a Pakistani triple jumper. He won a gold medal in the triple jump event of the 2010 South Asian Games in Dhaka. 2010.

Zafar Iqbal is sergeant in Pakistan Army and he is currently serving in 18 Punjab "The Desert Hawks". This renowned and one of the most chivalrous units of Pakistan Army has produced number of national and international sportsmen.

References

External links

Living people
Pakistani male long jumpers
Pakistani male triple jumpers
1982 births
South Asian Games gold medalists for Pakistan
South Asian Games medalists in athletics
21st-century Pakistani people